Szentendre Island is an island in the Danube River between the Danube Bend and Budapest in Hungary. It is 31 km long with an area of 56 km², and forms part of the Szentendre District of Pest County.

The Megyeri Bridge, carrying Budapests's M0 motorway ring road, crosses the southern tip of the island, but there is no access to the island's road network from it. The island is connected to the mainland by the  that crosses the Szentendre branch. There are also a number of ferries, across both the Szentendre and main branches of the Danube. 

Several villages are located on the island including (from north to south) Kisoroszi, Tahitótfalu, Pócsmegyer, Surány, Szigetmonostor and Horány. In addition to farmland, orchards and vineyards, the island's most important role is to supply Budapest and the neighbouring towns with water.

References

River islands of Hungary
Islands of the Danube